are a genre of Japanese  woodblock print, which appear on rigid, paddle-shaped hand fans known as .

characteristics
Unlike folding hand fans, which originated in Japan in the 6th or 7th century, non-folding flat, oval or "bean-shaped"  were a Chinese import. In terms of popular usage,  had a close connection with Edo urban culture which gained momentum during the seventeenth and eighteenth centuries.

Historically,  were an ostensibly feminine accessory, with men more typically carrying folding fans. They were simultaneously fashion accessories and functional items for daily use. They are strongly associated with summer, having been sold only during the summer months, and often decorated with summer imagery. At least one critic argues that, due to their use by women during periods of intense heat,  "can have suggestive connotations." 
 
 are used by many today as devices for personal cooling, as well as for fanning rice to cool it in the preparation of sushi. More ceremonially, they can still be seen in a number of contexts, including a variety of summer dance performances and as an accessory carried by referees during sumo matches.

history
 with printed designs were first produced in Japan sometime in or prior to the 1680s. One of the earliest extant examples is a 1684  by  entitled , which includes illustrations within fan-shaped frames.

Ebiya printed and sold both fan and standard-sized prints until around 1895. Although Ebiya's publishing house originally commissioned designs from Utagawa Kunisada and Utagawa Kuniyoshi exclusively, they expanded their roster to include other artists from the late 1850s.

Beginning in 1815 and lasting to the end of the Edo period (1603-1868), fan prints were commonly marked with seals indicating their year of publication.

Examples
Some notable  works which survive in collections today are by Katsukawa Shunshō (1726-1793), Utagawa Toyokuni (1769-1825), Kunisada (1786-1865), Kuniyoshi (1797-1861) and Hiroshige (1797-1858).

 are by definition accessories intended for practical, everyday use. As a result of their frequent handling, few pristine mounted examples of  remain. For this reason, art historian Amy Reigle Newland has suggested that  "are probably among the most elusive of all categories of  prints to study and collect."

See also
 Fan print with two bugaku dancers (Kunisada)

Notes

References

 Bell, David. Ukiyo-e Explained. Kent, U.K.: Global Oriental, 2004.
 Halsey, William Darrach and Friedman, Emanuel. "Folding fan." Collier's Encyclopedia, vol. 9. Macmillan Educational Co., 1983.
 Harris, Frederick. Ukiyo-e: The Art of the Japanese Print. Tokyo: Tuttle, 2010.
 Marks, Andreas. Japanese Woodblock Prints: Artists, Publishers and Masterworks 1680-1900. Tokyo: Tuttle, 2010.
 Newland, Amy Reigle. Ed. The Hotei Encyclopedia of Japanese Woodblock Prints. Vol. 2. Amsterdam: Hotei Publishing, 2005.
 Salter, Rebecca. Japanese Popular Prints:  From Votive Strips to Playing Cards. London: A & C Black, 2006.

Ventilation fans
Ukiyo-e genres
Japanese words and phrases